Truthless Heroes is the third studio album released by the U.S. post-hardcore band Project 86. It was released on September 12, 2002 on Tooth & Nail Records and September 24, 2002 on Atlantic Records and debuted at number 146 on the Billboard Top 200, with over 7000 copies sold.

Truthless Heroes is a concept album that frontman Andrew Schwab states "takes you through the protagonist's attempts to gratify himself and fill his deepest needs as a person through fame, fortune, lust, whatever."

Track list
"Little Green Men" – 3:25
"Caught in the Middle" – 3:33
"Know What It Means" – 4:16
"Salem's Suburbs" – 3:38
"...A Word from Our Sponsors" – 0:44
"S.M.C." – 2:49
"Team Black" – 3:26
"Your Heroes Are Dead" – 3:55
"...To Brighten Your Day" – 1:12
"Another Boredom Movement" – 3:56
"Bottom Feeder"  – 5:13
"Shelter Me Mercury" – 3:09
"...And Help You Sleep" – 1:44
"Last Meal"  – 3:51
"Soma" – 4:12
"Hollow Again" – 4:31
"...With Regards, T.H." – 1:59

Personnel
Project 86
 Andrew Schwab - vocals
 Randy Torres - guitar, keyboards, backing vocals, co lead vocals 
 Steven Dail - bass, backing vocals
 Alex Albert - drums

Additional musicians
 Holland Greco - guest vocals on "Bottom Feeder"
 Mark Salomon - guest vocals on "Last Meal"

Chart performance

Weekly charts

Singles

References

2002 albums
Project 86 albums
Atlantic Records albums
Tooth & Nail Records albums
Albums produced by Matt Hyde
Concept albums